Ellis Marcus (May 6, 1918 – June 23, 1990), was an American television writer whose career spanned four decades. He contributed episodes to over fifty television programs from 1949 through 1984. His wife, Ann (1921-2014), was a writer and producer; the couple had three children.

Career
Marcus got his start writing for live television shows in New York in the 1940s. His credits include episodic work on television shows such as Highway Patrol, Lassie, Falcon Crest, and Mission Impossible. He and his wife created the soap opera spoof, The Life and Times of Eddie Roberts, also commonly known as L.A.T.E.R., together. They both served as producers on the show.

In the late 1980s, Marcus was a Governor of the Academy of Television Arts and Sciences. He died of a heart attack at the age of 72 in Encino, California.

Filmography

Films

Television

References

American male television writers
1990 deaths
Place of death missing
1918 births
Place of birth missing
20th-century American screenwriters
Writers from Pittsburgh
20th-century American male writers